Este Haim (born March 14, 1986) is an American musician and composer. She is best known as a member of the pop-rock trio Haim, which Este formed with her younger sisters Alana and Danielle. Este is Haim's bass player and a vocalist. She co-writes all of Haim's songs.

Since 2021, Haim has composed scores for film and television. She acted as a music consultant for season 2 of HBO's The White Lotus.

Early life 
Haim grew up in the San Fernando Valley, California and studied at LA County's High School For The Arts. Her family is Jewish, though they do not describe themselves as religious.  Haim's father, Mordechai "Moti" Haim, is an Israeli-born retired professional soccer player who moved to the United States in 1980. Her mother, Donna Rose, is a former elementary school art teacher from Philadelphia. Haim's paternal grandmother was originally from Bulgaria.

The Haim sisters were taught to play instruments from an early age by their parents, with Haim being encouraged to learn bass guitar by her father. Donna, Moti and their children formed a family band, performing covers for charity gigs and at children's hospitals.

Haim graduated from University of California, Los Angeles with a degree in ethnomusicology.

Career

Haim 

Haim was formed in 2006, and played their first show in 2007. They released their first EP Falling as a free download on their website after meeting producer Ludwig Goransson. Their critically acclaimed debut album Days Are Gone was released in 2013,  followed by their sophomore album Something to Tell You in 2017. Haim's third album Women in Music Pt. III was issued in June 2020, after the band postponed its release due to the COVID-19 pandemic.

Composing 
In 2021, Haim composed the score for the Netflix limited series Maid. She became involved in the project through a friend who was executive producing the show. Haim collaborated with Christopher Stracey, a member of the electronic duo Bag Raiders. While Christopher produced and played synth-based sounds, Haim played most of the instruments. While working on the music for Maid, Haim and Christopher were approached to score the film Cha Cha Real Smooth.

Haim wrote original music for the Netflix teen movie Do Revenge. She collaborated with composer Amanda Yamate.

Music consultant roles 
Haim served as music consultant for season 2 of the HBO series The White Lotus after being invited to the set by her friend Dave Bernad. Bernad executive produced the series, and asked Haim to work on the show after observing her interactions with actress Beatrice Granno.

Podcast 
Haim hosted the pop culture and music podcast That Thing I Do with actor Darren Criss. One series of the podcast was released in 2021.

Personal life 
Haim was diagnosed with Type 1 diabetes at age fourteen, during her first year of high school. In interviews, she has discussed the challenges of managing Diabetes as a touring musician. When Haim first performed at Glastonbury Festival, Haim fainted after taking insulin without the opportunity to eat. In 2018, Haim was diagnosed with stage 3 kidney disease. She has since started wearing a continuous glucose monitor which she credits with transforming how she manages her diabetes.

Artistry 
Este is a multi-instrumentalist who plays bass guitar, drums and guitar. Este's main instrument is a 1975 Fender Precision Bass. Her first bass was a Fender Jazz Precision, which she purchased herself after saving up her allowance. Este prefers to play without a pick and rarely uses effects. Bass Magazine described her style as diverse, "which allows her to both play for the song and play for the bass, at all times".

Discography

Haim 
 Days Are Gone (2013)
 Something to Tell You (2017)
 Women in Music Pt. III (2020)

As composer 
 Maid (miniseries) (2021)
 Cha Cha Real Smooth (2022)
 Do Revenge (2022)

Filmography

Film

Cultural influence 
Este is name-checked in the Taylor Swift song No Body, No Crime, which tells the story of avenging a murder. Swift named the song's character after Este because she knew that Este would be excited to be included in a murder-mystery track.

References

External links
 

1986 births
Living people
Musicians from Los Angeles
American people of Israeli descent
Singer-songwriters from California
Jewish American musicians
American women guitarists
Los Angeles County High School for the Arts alumni
21st-century American Jews
21st-century American women
American people of Bulgarian-Jewish descent
American bass guitarists
Women bass guitarists
University of California, Los Angeles alumni